Menahga School is a public high school in Menahga, Minnesota, United States serving grades 912; it is located immediately east of U.S. Route 71.

Academics
Menahga runs on a seven-period schedule.  The year is broken up into two semesters with two quarters within each semester, for a total of four quarters.  School is in session from 8:15 a.m. – 3:16 p.m.

Extracurricular activities

Clubs and organizations

The activities offered to Menahga School students include Knowledge Bowl, Business Professionals of America (BPA), Future Farmers of America (FFA), Family Community Career Leaders of America (FCCLA), National Honor Society (NHS), Math League, Student Council, History Club, M-Club, Speech, and One-Act Play.

Sports
Menahga School offers multiple sport opportunities to all of the student body attending Menahga. The range of sports for males include Cross Country, Football, Basketball, Wrestling, Track, Baseball, Hockey and Golf.  The sports offered to females include Cross Country, Volleyball, Gymnastics, Basketball, Track, Softball, Hockey, Cheerleading and Golf.
Menahga and its southern neighbor, Cheerleading, Wrestling, Golf, and Football.  The combined teams are known as the United North Central Warriors, and the team colors are gold and black.

Music
Menahga School's music department offers band classes, choir classes, and guitar classes, which are taught by Elizabeth Hahn and April Hodge, band and choir, respectively.

References

External links
 

Public high schools in Minnesota
Schools in Wadena County, Minnesota
Educational institutions established in 1953
1953 establishments in Minnesota